Vaughn Granter (born September 14, 1965) is a politician in Newfoundland and Labrador who currently serves as a City Councillor in Corner Brook. Granter previously served as the Minister of Fisheries and Aquaculture in the Davis government. He was elected to serve in the Newfoundland and Labrador House of Assembly on February 15, 2011 and re-elected in the 2011 general election.

Granter worked as in the education profession since 1987, most recently as a high school principal at Corner Brook Regional High. Granter ran for public office in the electoral district of Humber West in a by-election that was called after the resignation of Premier Danny Williams. He defeated two other opponents including Liberal, Mark Watton on February 15, 2011 with a large majority to hold the seat for the Progressive Conservative party. Granter did not run for re-election in the 2015 provincial election.

In 2017, Granter successfully ran for Corner Brook City Council. He was re-elected in the 2021 municipal elections.

Electoral history 
}

|-

|-

|NDP
|Jordan Stringer
|align="right"|764
|align="right"|19.43%
|align="right"|
|}

}

|NDP
|Rosie Myers
|align="right"|112
|align="right"|3.38%
|align="right"|
|}

References

1965 births
Living people
Members of the Executive Council of Newfoundland and Labrador
Progressive Conservative Party of Newfoundland and Labrador MHAs
St. Francis Xavier University alumni
People from Corner Brook
21st-century Canadian politicians
Newfoundland and Labrador municipal councillors